Isaiah Jones is the name of:

Isaiah Jones (footballer, born 1999), English footballer for Middlesbrough
Isaiah Jones (footballer, born 2001), English footballer for Forest Green Rovers